Peter rehra, ਪੀਟਰ ਰੇਹੜਾ  is a homemade jugaad vehicle used in rural Punjab and other North Indian states. It is made by assembling a diesel engine, (mostly meant for pumping water), removing the pumpset assembly from it, and joining it with a framework made steel angles and wooden planks, and finally completing it all by putting four movable wheels, two are steerable (like in all vehicles) and the two rear ones directly attached to the engine via a primitive gear-assembly. It is, of course, not meant for high-performance, but for sheer-economy, as it is easily able to carry twenty to twenty-five adults (plus their luggage), but mostly cannot move at more than 25 km/h. There has been instances when police themselves used this to carry a whole Maruti 800 (which they could not drive out of court orders)

Though it is not technically recognized by the Government as a legal-vehicle, its use is quite common, mainly due to the high demand for public transport and lack of proper bus and train routes, especially to underdeveloped parts of the North Indian provinces.

The name has originated from "Petter", a brand of small diesel engines imported to India in early 1960s.

It is also known as Gharruka(ਘੜੁੱਕਾ), Maruta(ਮਾਰੂਤਾ) - the male version of Maruti 800 car by Maruti Suzuki partnership in India or Dhindsa(ਢੀਂਡਸਾ) - after the name of the then Transport Minister of Punjab.

References

External links
ਅਜ਼ਾਇਬਘਰ 
ਪੀਟਰ ਰੇਹੜੇ ਹੇਠ ਆਉਣ ਨਾਲ ਬਜ਼ੁਰਗ ਦੀ ਮੌਤ

Automotive industry in India
Vehicle law
Low-speed vehicles